Archduke Heinrich Anton of Austria (Heinrich Anton Maria Rainer Karl Gregor), (May 9, 1828, Milan – November 30, 1891, Vienna) was an Archduke of Austria and Lieutenant field marshal.

Biography
Ernst was the fifth son of the viceroy Archduke Rainer Joseph of Austria and Princess Elisabeth of Savoy. In 1852 was made a Knight of the Order of the Golden Fleece by Emperor Franz Joseph I of Austria.

Heinrich Anton had a military career and became Feldmarschallleutnant and commander of a division in Graz and later Brünn. He saw action in the War against Italy and distinguished himself during the Battle of Custoza (1866). 

Heinrich Anton married morganatically on February 4 1868 in Bolzano with singer Leopoldine Hofmann (1840–1891), who became Freifrau von Waideck in 1878. They had 1 daughter Marie Rainiera (1872–1936), Countess von Waideck, who married in 1892 Enrico Lucchesi Palli, Duke della Grazia and Prince of Campofranco (1861–1924), grandson of Maria Carolina of Bourbon, the famous Duchess of Berry.

The Emperor Franz Joseph I of Austria disapproved of this morganatic marriage and Heinrich Anton was expelled from the Royal family. He laid down all his military functions and moved to Luzern in Switzerland, where the couple lived until he was pardoned by the Emperor in 1871.

The couple returned to Lombardy–Venetia where Heinrich Anton retired from the army and lived in a palace in the Musterstreet in Bolzano. On a rare visit to Vienna in 1891, both Heinrich Anton and his wife contracted pneumonia and they died in the same night.

Ancestry

Sources
Constantin von Wurzbach: Habsburg, Heinrich Anton Maria Rainer Karl Gregor. In: Biographisches Lexikon des Kaiserthums Oesterreich. Part 6. Kaiserlich-königliche Hof- und Staatsdruckerei, Wien 1860, Page 277.
Sigmund Hahn: Reichsraths-Almanach für die Session, Satow, 1867, S. 50.

1828 births
1891 deaths
House of Habsburg-Lorraine
Knights of the Golden Fleece of Austria
Austrian princes